Marco Antonio Muñiz (born 3 March 1933) is a Mexican singer from Jalisco, Mexico. Known all over Mexico, he also acted in the 1965 film Sinful (Spanish: El Pecador). He belongs to the Golden Age of Mexican cinema.

Early life and career
Muñiz was born in Guadalajara, Jalisco. From an early age, he showed musical talent.

Muñiz's first album was a tribute to singers of other eras. It was titled "Aquellas Canciones!" ("Those Songs!"), and it was released in 1956. That was the first of close to 80 albums, all of which he recorded under the BMG or RCA Internacional labels.  For many years he was part of the musical group "Los Tres Ases" and recorded many songs that made the Group famous and made Muniz famous too.

Career in the 60s
In 1965, he began an uninterrupted streak of years traveling to Puerto Rico's Caribe Hilton Hotel in San Juan around Christmas, to offer concerts there. (At one time, Muñiz claimed he was such a regular at the hotel that he could figure his way out of any of the hotel's suites and out of the facility blindfolded). This lasted close to thirty years. Muñiz has since returned for yearly shows at the Caribe Hilton, this time around Mother's Day.

Releases
Among the albums recorded by Muñiz are Marco Antonio Muñiz con Los Trovadores del Caribe which was his fourth album, Mi Novia es Guadalajara! (Guadalajara is my Girlfriend!), which was his fifth, Salsa a la Manera de... (Salsa, Marco Antonio's Way..., which represented his first foray into the Salsa rhythm), 1991's Mi Borinquén Querido (My Dear Borinquen, where he paid homage to Puerto Rican folklore music), a 1993 dedication to Pedro Infante, and a 1997 album and CD which was dedicated to José Alfredo Jiménez.

His extensive solo career includes top 40 hit chart singles all over Latin America such as "Voy a Cambiar Mi Corazón" by singer/composer Miguel Poventud. He is an international artist with fans in Brazil and Poland.

Personal life
In 1987, Muñiz married Jessica Munguia de Muñiz. He has seven children, 5 sons and 2 daughters.

References

External links
Polish page about Marco Antonio Muniz

1933 births
Living people
Mexican male singers
Singers from Guadalajara, Jalisco
Latin Grammy Lifetime Achievement Award winners